Batman Fights Drácula  is a 1967 Filipino superhero film directed by Leody M. Diaz and scripted by Bert R. Mendoza. The film, which was not authorized by DC, is thought to be lost.

Synopsis
The story concerned the mad scientist named Dr. Zorba who, after repeatedly being defeated by Batman, finds a way to resurrect the wicked Count Dracula, control him, and even make him stronger, rendering him invincible towards traditional ways of killing him, such as Christian crosses.

Dracula sneaks into the Batcave, and attacks Batman. Batman attempts to use holy water and a cross to injure the vampire, but due to Zorba's machinations, they have no effect. Dracula throws Batman against a wall and then flees, leaving Batman knocked out. When the unconscious Batman is found by his butler, Turko (a character based on Alfred Pennyworth), he tends to the crime fighter's wounds and then calls for Batman's girlfriend and sidekick to aid in tracking down his attacker.

After tracking down Zorba at his underground fortress, Ruben (a character based on the existing sidekick Robin) and the beautiful Marita manage to kill the evil doctor by turning the vampire against him. The vampire then is investigated by a recovering Batman within a cage in the Batcave, and the film ends with Batman lecturing Dracula about justice.

Credited cast
Jing Abalos as Batman/Bruce Mabuto
Ramon d'Salva as Dr. Zorba
Vivian Lorrain as Marita Banzon
Nort Nepomuceno as Alan "Turko" Turkentop
Dante Rivero as Dracula
Rolan Robles as Ruben

See also
 Alyas Batman at Robin
 James Batman
 Batman & Dracula trilogy

References

External links

 

1967 films
1967 independent films
1960s superhero films
Lost Philippine films
Unofficial Batman films
Dracula films
1960s lost films
Mad scientist films
Resurrection in film
1960s American films